Carlos Edgar Fonseca (born March 6, 1981, in Duitama, Boyacá) is a male professional road cyclist from Colombia.

Career

2005
1st in Stage 2 Clasica del Meta (COL)
2008
1st in Stage 5 Vuelta a Colombia, La Dorada (COL)

References
 

1981 births
Living people
Colombian male cyclists
Vuelta a Colombia stage winners
Sportspeople from Boyacá Department
21st-century Colombian people